The title Duke of Lennox has been created several times in the peerage of Scotland, for Clan Stewart of Darnley. The dukedom, named for the district of Lennox in Dumbarton, was first created in 1581, and had formerly been the Earldom of Lennox. The second duke was made Duke of Richmond; at his death, the dukedom of Richmond became extinct. The fourth duke was also created Duke of Richmond; at the death of the sixth duke, both dukedoms became extinct. The Dukedom of Richmond and one month later that of Lennox were created in 1675 for Charles Lennox, an illegitimate son of Charles II. The Duke of Richmond and Lennox was created Duke of Gordon in 1876. Thus, the duke holds four dukedoms (including Aubigny-sur-Nère), more than any other person in the realm.

Dukes of Lennox (1581)

Dukes of Lennox (1675)

The heir apparent is Charles Gordon-Lennox (b. 1994), eldest son of the 11th Duke.

Family Tree

See also
Duke of Richmond and Lennox
Duke of Richmond
Duke of Gordon
Duke of Aubigny
Earl of Lennox
Stewart of Darnley

References

Further reading

Dukedoms in the Peerage of Scotland
Noble titles created in 1675
Noble titles created in 1581
1581 establishments in Scotland
Dukes of Lennox